The High Commissioner of Australia to Kiribati is an officer of the Australian Department of Foreign Affairs and Trade and the head of the High Commission of the Commonwealth of Australia to Kiribati, located in Tarawa. The position has the rank and status of an Ambassador Extraordinary and Plenipotentiary and is currently held by David Yardley. As fellow members of the Commonwealth of Nations, diplomatic relations between Australia and Kiribati are between High Commissioners rather than ambassadors. The High Commission is one of four diplomatic missions in Kiribati, alongside New Zealand, Taiwan and Cuba. The High Commission supports and manages Australia's extensive Official Development Assistance program to Kiribati, which constitutes 31% of all ODA to the country (15% of Kiribati's GDP).

Posting history
Australia formally recognised Kiribati on its independence from the United Kingdom in 1979, but diplomatic contacts were much earlier with the High Commissioner in Nauru dual-accredited as Commissioner to the Gilbert and Ellice Islands (1972–1976) and the Gilbert Islands (1976–1979), and then non-resident accredited High Commissioner to Kiribati from 1979. In 1981, The Australian Government announced that it would open a resident High Commission in Kiribati in recognition of "the importance which Australia attached to relations with not only Kiribati but to its regional neighbours in the South Pacific." 

On 7 November 2003, Kiribati established diplomatic relations with the Republic of China (Taiwan), but it was alleged later on that the Australian High Commissioner, Jurek Juszczyk, had urged President Anote Tong not to recognise Taiwan, as this would inevitably sever relations with China. Although Kiribati did not sever ties with the PRC,  Beijing suspended ties on 29 November after failed attempts to lobby President Tong to change his mind.

High Commissioners

References

External links

Australian High Commission, Kiribati

Kiribati

Australia and the Commonwealth of Nations
Kiribati and the Commonwealth of Nations